Sebacic acid is a naturally occurring dicarboxylic acid with the chemical formula . It is a white flake or powdered solid. Sebaceus is Latin for tallow candle, sebum is Latin for tallow, and refers to its use in the manufacture of candles. Sebacic acid is a derivative of castor oil.

In the industrial setting, sebacic acid and its homologues such as azelaic acid can be used as a monomer for nylon 610, plasticizers, lubricants, hydraulic fluids, cosmetics, candles, etc.

Production
Sebacic acid is produced from castor oil by cleavage of ricinoleic acid, which is obtained from castor oil. Octanol & glycerin is a byproduct.  

It can also be obtained from decalin via the tertiary hydroperoxide, which gives cyclodecenone, a precursor to sebacic acid.

Potential medical significance
Sebum is a secretion by skin sebaceous glands. It is a waxy set of lipids composed of triglycerides (≈41%), wax esters (≈26%), squalene (≈12%), and free fatty acids (≈16%). Included in the free fatty acid secretions in sebum are polyunsaturated fatty acids of which sebacic acid is a major component. Sebacic acid is also found in other lipids that coat the skin surface. Human neutrophils can convert sebacic acid to its 5-oxo analog, i.e., a structural analog of 5-oxo-eicosatetraenoic acid and like this oxo-eicosatetraenoic acid is an exceptionally potent activator of eosinophils, monocytes, and other pro-inflammatory cells from humans and other species. This action is mediated by the OXER1 receptor on these cells. It is suggested that sebacic acid is converted to its 5-oxo analog during, and thereby stimulates pro-inflammatory cells to contribute to the worsening of, various inflammatory skin conditions.

References

Dicarboxylic acids